Sun Mengya (born 3 May 2001) is a Chinese sprint canoeist. She  won the gold medal with her teammate Xu Shixiao in women's C-2 500 metres at 2020 Summer Olympics In Tokyo on 7 August 2021.

Career 
She won a medal at the 2019 ICF Canoe Sprint World Championships.

She qualified for the 2020 Summer Olympics, where she and her partner Xu Shixiao won the gold medal in women's C-2 500 metres in the event's debut on the Olympic stage, which replaced the men's K-2 200 metres as the Olympics moves toward gender equality.

References

2001 births
Living people
Chinese female canoeists
ICF Canoe Sprint World Championships medalists in Canadian
Asian Games medalists in canoeing
Asian Games gold medalists for China
Medalists at the 2018 Asian Games
Canoeists at the 2018 Asian Games
Olympic canoeists of China
Canoeists at the 2020 Summer Olympics
Medalists at the 2020 Summer Olympics
Olympic gold medalists for China
Olympic medalists in canoeing